Şahverdili (also, Şəhverdili, Shakhverdili, and Shakh-Verdylyar) is a village and municipality in the Imishli Rayon of Azerbaijan.  It has a population of 1,315.

References 

Populated places in Imishli District